The women's discus F40 event at the 2008 Summer Paralympics took place at the Beijing National Stadium at 17:30 on 13 September.
There was a single round of competition; after the first three throws, only the top eight had 3 further throws.
The competition was won by Menggen Jimisu, representing .

Results

 
WR = World Record. SB = Seasonal Best.

References
 

Athletics at the 2008 Summer Paralympics
2008 in women's athletics